Isabella Augustine Alarie (born April 23, 1998) is an American professional basketball player who last played for the Dallas Wings of the Women's National Basketball Association (WNBA). She is currently sitting out the 2022 season. She played college basketball for the Princeton Tigers. She was the three-time Ivy League Player of the Year (from 2018 to 2020) and was selected to All-America Honorable Mention by the Associated Press (AP). She is the daughter of Mark Alarie, a retired professional basketball player who played in the NBA for the 1986–91 seasons.

College career
Alarie started in all 106 games during her career in Princeton from the 2016–17 to 2019–20 seasons. In her junior year (2018–19 season), she averaged a career best double-double of 22.8 ppg and 10.6 rpg. Alarie is a career 34.8% 3-point shooter who also averaged 1.2 steals and 2.3 blocks per game. Following the 2019-20 season, Alarie was named an Honorable Mention All-American by the Associated Press.

Career statistics

College

|-
| style="text-align:left; | 2016–17
| style="text-align:left;"| Princeton
| 30 || 30 || 30.6 || .432 || .379 || .667 || 8.0 || 2.1 || 1.1 || 1.7 || 1.7 || 12.6
|-
| style="text-align:left;"| 2017–18
| style="text-align:left;"| Princeton
| 30 || 30 || 30.7 || .489 || .328 || .789 || 9.4 || 2.3 || 1.3 || 2.6 || 1.7 || 13.3
|-
| style="text-align:left;"| 2018–19
| style="text-align:left;"| Princeton
| 23 || 23 || 32.1 || .515 || .295 || .829 || 10.6 || 3.4 || 1.2 || 2.8 || 1.9 || 22.8
|-
| style="text-align:left;"| 2019–20*
| style="text-align:left;"| Princeton
| 23 || 23 || 29.8 || .474 || .356 || .744 || 8.6 || 2.3 || 1.2 || 2.3 || 1.7 || 17.5
|- class="sortbottom"
| style="text-align:center;" colspan="2"| Career
| 106 || 106 || 30.8 || .480 || .348 || .761 || 9.1 || 2.5 || 1.2 || 2.3 || 1.7 || 16.1

* 2020 NCAA tournament cancelled due to COVID-19 pandemic
Source: goprincetontigers.com

WNBA

Regular season

Source

|-
| style="text-align:left;"| 2020
| style="text-align:left;"| Dallas
| style="background:#D3D3D3"|22° || 3 || 14.0 || .364 || .077 || .833 || 2.9 || 0.5 || 0.6 || 0.8 || 0.5 || 2.7
|-
| style="text-align:left;"| 2021
| style="text-align:left;"| Dallas
| 31 || 11 || 13.1 || .500 || .000 || .850 || 3.3 || 0.5 || 0.6 || 0.6 || 0.6 || 2.6
|-
| align="left" | Career
| 2 years, 1 team
| 53 || 14 || 13.5 || .431 || .067 || .844 || 3.1 || 0.5 || 0.6 || 0.7 || 0.5 || 2.6
|}

Playoffs

|-
| style="text-align:left;"| 2021
| style="text-align:left;"| Dallas
| 1 || 1 || 4.0 || – || – || – || 3.0 || 1.0 || 0.0 || 0.0 || 1.0 || 0.0
|}

Personal life 
Bella Alarie is the daughter of Mark Alarie and Rene Augustine. She has two brothers, Christian and Alexander. Mark Alarie was a two-time All-ACC first-team selection at Duke and was drafted in the first round of 1986 NBA draft. Rene Augustine was appointed the Acting Deputy Assistant Attorney General of the Antitrust Division at the Department of Justice in 2019 and the Deputy Assistant Attorney General of the Antitrust Division at the Department of Justice in 2020. Bella's grandfather, Norman Augustine, graduated magna cum laude from Princeton and was a professor at Princeton's School of Engineering and Applied Science from 1997 to 1999, and is the former CEO of Lockheed-Martin Corp.

References

1998 births
Living people
American expatriate basketball people in Turkey
American women's basketball players
Basketball players at the 2019 Pan American Games
Basketball players from Maryland
Centers (basketball)
Dallas Wings draft picks
Dallas Wings players
Galatasaray S.K. (women's basketball) players
Pan American Games medalists in basketball
Pan American Games silver medalists for the United States
Power forwards (basketball)
Princeton Tigers women's basketball players
Medalists at the 2019 Pan American Games
United States women's national basketball team players